The British Virgin Islands compete at the 2009 World Championships in Athletics from 15 to 23 August in Berlin.

Team selection

Track and road events

Results

References

External links
Official competition website

Nations at the 2009 World Championships in Athletics
World Championships in Athletics
British Virgin Islands at the World Championships in Athletics